Jeremy Noble may refer to:

 Jeremy Noble (musicologist) (1930–2017), English musicologist and music critic
 Jeremy Noble (writer) (born 1960), English writer, screenwriter, playwright and actor